The 2014 NBL Finals was the championship series of the 2013–14 NBL season and the conclusion of the season's playoffs. The Perth Wildcats defeated the Adelaide 36ers in three games (2–1) to claim their sixth NBL championship.

Format
The 2013–14 National Basketball League Finals was played in March and April 2014 between the top four teams of the regular season, consisting of two best-of-three semi-final and final series, where the higher seed hosted the first and third games.

Qualification

Qualified teams

Ladder

Seedings

 Perth Wildcats
 Adelaide 36ers
 Melbourne Tigers
 Wollongong Hawks

The NBL tie-breaker system as outlined in the NBL Rules and Regulations states that in the case of an identical win–loss record, the results in games played between the teams will determine order of seeding.

Bracket

Semi-finals series

(1) Perth Wildcats vs (4) Wollongong Hawks

Regular season series

Perth won 3–1 in the regular season series:

(2) Adelaide 36ers vs (3) Melbourne Tigers

Regular season series

Tied 2–2 in the regular season series; 367-356 points differential to Adelaide:

Grand Final series

(1) Perth Wildcats vs (2) Adelaide 36ers

Regular season series

Tied 2–2 in the regular season series; 334-333 points differential to Adelaide:

See also
 2013–14 NBL season
 2013–14 Adelaide 36ers season

References

Finals
National Basketball League (Australia) Finals